Kabout was laid down as YT-221; launched December 1943 by the Elizabeth City Shipyard, Elizabeth City, NC; sponsored by Mrs. J. C. Fegan; and reclassified YTB-221 on 15 May 1944 prior to being placed in service 3 July for duty in the 5th Naval District. She remained in operation there until 1 May 1959 when she was struck from the Navy List. She was sold to Ships, Inc., Norfolk, VA, 7 August 1959.

References 
 

 

Tugs of the United States Navy
1944 ships
Ships built in Elizabeth City, North Carolina